Iéna is a station on Line 9 of the Paris Métro, named after the Avenue d'Iéna. The station opened on 27 May 1923 with the extension of the line from Trocadéro to Saint-Augustin. Iéna is the French name of Jena where the Napoleon's army defeated Prussia in 1806 at the Battle of Jena. It is the nearest station to the Guimet Museum (Asian art) and the Palais de Tokyo (contemporary art museum), as well as the Embassy of Mexico, the International Chamber of Commerce, and the Pont d'Iéna ("Jena Bridge").

Station layout

References

Paris Métro stations in the 16th arrondissement of Paris
Railway stations in France opened in 1923